The United States Air Force organized its first air refueling squadrons in 1948.  In 1955, Strategic Air Command (SAC) organized the first wing to command air refueling units at Dow Air Force Base, Maine.  Since then, air refueling wings have been organized by Tactical Air Command (TAC), Military Airlift Command (MAC), United States Air Forces in Europe (USAFE) and Air Mobility Command (AMC).  Additional wings have been organized in the Air National Guard (ANG) and the Air Reserves (AFRES).

Background
Prior to 1991, some refueling wings' full designations also included an additional parenthetical.  They included:
 Air Refueling Wing, Heavy: Boeing KC-135 Stratotanker, McDonnell Douglas KC-10 Extender
 Air Refueling Wing, Medium: Boeing KC-97 Stratofreighter, Boeing KB-29 Superfortress, Boeing KB-50 Superfortress
 Air Refueling Wing, Tactical: Boeing KC-97 Stratofreighter, Boeing KB-29 Superfortress, Boeing KB-50 Superfortress
 Air Refueling Wing, Fighter-Bomber: Boeing KB-29 Superfortress
 Air Refueling Wing (Training): Boeing KC-97 Stratofreighter

Air refueling squadrons were also assigned to other types of wings, most frequently to bombardment wings, but also to strategic wings, strategic aerospace wings, strategic fighter wings, fighter-bomber wings, tactical reconnaissance wings, or (generic) wings.

List of wings

References

Notes
 Explanatory notes

 Citations

Bibliography
 
 
 

 Further reading
 
 

 *
air refueling